Little Fuzhou is a neighborhood in the Two Bridges and Lower East Side areas of the borough of Manhattan in New York City. Little Fuzhou constitutes a portion of the greater Manhattan Chinatown, home to the highest concentration of Chinese people in the Western Hemisphere. Manhattan's Chinatown is also one of the oldest Chinese ethnic enclaves. 

Manhattan Chinatown is one of nine Chinatown neighborhoods in New York City, as well as one of twelve in the New York metropolitan area, which contains the largest ethnic Chinese population outside of Asia, comprising an estimated 893,697 uniracial individuals as of 2017. Starting in the 1980s and especially in the 1990s, the neighborhood became a prime destination for immigrants from Fuzhou, Fujian, China. 

Manhattan's Little Fuzhou is centered on East Broadway. However, since the 2000s, Chinatown in the neighborhood of Sunset Park became New York City's new primary destination for the Fuzhou immigrants, surpassing the original enclave in Manhattan.

History

Early history

East Broadway was once a main street of a large Jewish community in the Lower East Side. Over the years, Puerto Ricans and African-Americans settled on the street. During the 1960s, an influx of immigrants from Hong Kong and Vietnam found homes on East Broadway and the areas surrounding it. Slowly, the Puerto Ricans, the Jews, and the African-Americans moved from the area.

Manhattan enclave
 

It was during the 1980s when an influx of illegal immigrants from Fuzhou, especially Changle, Fuqing, and Lianjiang flooded East Broadway and a Little Fuzhou enclave evolved on the street, it became fully part of Chinatown, also known as the New Chinatown of Manhattan. The Fuzhou immigrants could often speak Mandarin in addition to their native Fuzhounese language (also known as Fuzhou dialect). While all of the other Mandarin speakers were settling in and creating a more Mandarin-speaking Chinatown or Mandarin Town (國語埠) in Flushing's Chinatown and Elmhurst, Queens because they could not relate to the traditional Cantonese dominance in Manhattan's Chinatown.

This included the fact that it has had a long history of not being very welcoming of Chinese speakers that did not speak Cantonese and often easily largely discouraging them from settling into the neighborhood, the Fuzhou immigrants were the only exceptional non-Cantonese Chinese group to largely settle in Manhattan's Chinatown despite the fact that it was dominantly Cantonese speaking and was highly not very welcoming to the Fuzhou speakers coming in large numbers.

Although, it would have been more ideal for the Fuzhou immigrants to largely settle into Mandarin-speaking enclaves where they could have easily just communicated in Mandarin and likely face lesser barriers to getting job and housing opportunities with Mandarin-speaking employers and property owners, however due to the fact that the Mandarin-speaking enclaves were too middle class and expensive in addition to the fact the Mandarin-speaking enclaves during the 1980s–90s only had begun to emerge and were limited in Chinese businesses to offer low skilled job positions to new arriving Chinese immigrants and since many Fuzhou immigrants came without immigration paperwork and forced into low paying jobs, they were unable to economically settle into the Mandarin-speaking enclaves to seek low skilled jobs and affordable housing.

As a result, they had no choice but to settle into Manhattan's Chinatown to be around other Chinese people to seek affordable housing by Chinese property owners and find low skilled job opportunities offered by Chinese employers, often as seamstresses in factories and taking positions in waiting tables/dishwashing in restaurants in addition to the fact that it was the only large low income working-class Chinese community of New York City in the 1980s–90s that could abundantly offer these opportunities to the new incoming low skilled/lower socioeconomic Chinese immigrants as the other Chinatowns in Queens and Brooklyn were still relatively much smaller in its early developing stages with much more limited Chinese businesses/property owners even though Manhattan's Chinatown was still largely Cantonese dominated until the 1990s and as well being highly discriminatory against any Chinese speakers that were not Cantonese speakers.

Although the then Cantonese dominated Chinatown during the 1990s were very discriminatory against the incoming Fuzhou immigrants due to the linguistic/cultural differences in addition many of the Fuzhou immigrants were illegal immigrants with many Cantonese property owners and business owners attempting to discourage the Fuzhou immigrants from occupying job positions and apartment vacancies, many of the Fuzhou immigrants were able to withstand and resist these barriers and slowly created their own Chinatown east of the Bowery separate from the long-time established Cantonese Chinatown from the Bowery to the west.

East Broadway within Manhattan's Chinatown became a central hub for these recently arrived Fujianese immigrants. Since the Fuzhou immigrants spoke Eastern Min and not Cantonese, as well as their cultural differences and economic background, they were not able to integrate well into Manhattan's Chinatown, which was extremely Cantonese-dominated and as a result, they began to settle on East Broadway, which was still not fully Chinese populated and in addition to higher rates of available housing vacancies, which was another reason why they settled there. Eventually they created their own Fuzhou Chinatown east of the Bowery.

Originally, the influx of Fuzhou immigrants mainly concentrated in the East Broadway portion during the 1980s to early 1990s, creating the original Fuzhou Chinatown even though there were some scattered numbers of Fuzhou immigrants throughout the eastern portion of Chinatown, however the Eldridge portion became the later section of eastern Chinatown during the late 1990s and especially early 2000s to receive an influx of the Fuzhou immigrants creating a newer portion of the Fuzhou Chinatown roughly 8–12 years after the original core of the Fuzhou Chinatown was created in the East Broadway portion and then as a result, the eastern portion of Chinatown became dominated by Fuzhou immigrants.

The Fuzhou part of Chinatown is known as the New Chinatown of Manhattan and it is separate from what is known as the Old Chinatown or Original Chinatown of Manhattan, which is the long-established Cantonese Chinatown going from the Bowery to the western of part of Chinatown, although the Fuzhou portion of Chinatown also still has some remaining long time Cantonese residents and businesses scattered on different streets that had been residing there before the large influx of Fuzhou immigrants. In addition, the emergence of Little Fuzhou has helped Manhattan's Chinatown maintain the Chinese population. It further completed the full development of it being part of Chinatown and this street went from once being very quiet of only moderate Chinese population to a very full active lively Chinese business district scene.

The Bowery is the divider between the long-established Old Cantonese Chinatown and very recently established New Fuzhou Chinatown. When Manhattan's Chinatown was still vastly Cantonese-dominated and before the large Fuzhou influx, the Bowery was the original eastern borderline of Manhattan's Chinatown. The Fuzhou part of Chinatown primarily concentrated on the East Broadway and Eldridge Street portion became what is known as the New Chinatown of Manhattan and contributed to Manhattan's Chinatown growing and developing further east onto the Lower East Side in contrast to before when this portion was moderately Chinese populated. More than half are undocumented immigrants. With a large Fuzhou population, East Broadway is often referred to as Little Fuzhou by Fuzhou immigrants.

A considerable number of Fujianese clan associations can be found in and around the street, many of which are even specified by clans from certain villages of Fuzhou region, for example, the members of "Fujian Fuqi Association" are from Fuqi Village, Changle County, Fuzhou, Fujian. The Fukien American Association is also located here. Restaurants, markets and intercity bus lines run by Foochowese concentrate in East Broadway. A statue of Lin Zexu, who was also a Fuzhouese, was erected in Chatham Square in 1997.

During the 1980s, housing prices were dropping in Manhattan's Chinatown, but when the Fuzhou influx came in during the 1990s, property values increased very fast allowing landlords to make twice as much income. This also happened in Flushing, Queens and also very recently in Chinatown, Brooklyn, which is now on its way to becoming Brooklyn's Little Fuzhou.

When an influx of Fuzhou immigrants began to arrive during the 1980s and 1990s, they were entering into a Chinese community that was very vastly Cantonese-dominated. With many of them being unable to speak Cantonese and because of their illegal statuses, many of them were denied jobs and many resulted in criminal activities to survive a living, which later began to dominate the crimes that were going on in Manhattan's Chinatown.

Despite the Fuzhou population being large, the Cantonese population are still large on the Lower East Side, especially with the large Cantonese community established a long time ago in the western/historic (Chinatown's original size) portion of Chinatown also still being the main Chinese commercial business district for all of Manhattan's Chinatown and with the Chinatown Chinese businesses still mostly Cantonese owned along with Cantonese residing in more affluent areas also being important customers of Manhattan's Chinatown, the Cantonese language still remains important even though Mandarin is becoming the lingua franca of Chinatown allowing Cantonese to influence the cultural standards and economic resources of Chinatown.

This influenced many Fuzhou people in Manhattan's Chinatown to learn the Cantonese language to maintain jobs and as advantages to bring Cantonese customers to additionally contribute to their businesses, especially the large businesses like the dim sum restaurants on East Broadway. Due to the Fuzhou immigrants having the most interaction with Cantonese people than other groups of Chinese, the Fuzhou immigrants that can speak Cantonese constitute the vast majority of Non-Cantonese Chinese people that can speak Cantonese in NYC.

In addition, many of the earlier Fuzhou immigrants that arrived during the 1980s and early 1990s learned to speak Cantonese to be able to navigate getting jobs and being able to communicate with other Chinese people. The Chinatown area at the time was dominantly Cantonese speaking as well as there are significant numbers of Fuzhou immigrants that have spent time in Hong Kong and sometimes in Guangzhou picking up the Cantonese language and culture before immigrating into the USA, especially a very large proportion of the earlier Fuzhou immigrants had lived in Hong Kong before migrating to the USA. Although the eastern portion of Chinatown is now predominantly Fuzhou populated, there are still some long time Cantonese residents and businesses that remained behind and got caught in the Fuzhou enclave that emerged in addition to the fact that the western portion of Chinatown is still dominantly Cantonese populated.

Parallel to Mott Street for the Cantonese, East Broadway is the same for the Fuzhou immigrants. Within the Fuzhou population throughout NYC, many of them illegally subdivide apartments into small spaces to rent to other Fuzhou immigrants and East Broadway has the most shocking results of it including having many bunk beds within one tiny space. The earliest illegal Fuzhou immigrants came as early as the 1970s starting mostly with men. Similar to the early Cantonese male immigrants that had arrived over establishing New York's Chinatown in the late 1800s on Mott Street, Pell Street and Doyers Street and eventually being able to bring their families into America, the Fuzhou immigration pattern started out similarly with mostly men arriving first and then later on bringing their families over.

Gentrification and decline
Since the 2000s, the growth of newly arriving Fuzhou immigrants to Manhattan's Chinatown began to slow down and eventually the Fuzhou population in Manhattan's Chinatown has now started to decline, as the epicenter of Fuzhou immigration has relocated to Brooklyn due to increasing gentrification in Manhattan's Chinatown. Some Chinese landlords, especially many real estate agencies in Manhattan's Chinatown mainly of Cantonese descent, have been accused of prejudice against the Fuzhou immigrants, supposedly making Fuzhou immigrants feel unwelcome with concerns that they will not be able to pay rent secondary to debt to gangs that may have helped smuggled them in illegally into the United States and out of fear that gangs will come up to the apartments to cause trouble.

There is also supposedly concern that Fujianese are more likely to make the apartments too overcrowded by subdividing an apartment into multiple very tiny spaces to rent to other Fuzhou immigrants. Manhattan's Little Fuzhou has perhaps the most blatant results of illegal apartment subdivisions including having many bunk beds in just one small room. As a result of fear of being evicted by Cantonese landlords, many Fuzhou immigrants resorted to renting a tiny space from Fujianese landlords inside apartments already occupied by other Fuzhou immigrants.

Since the 2010s, the Fuzhou immigrant population and businesses have been declining throughout the whole eastern portion of Manhattan's Chinatown due to the gentrification. There is now a rapidly increasing influx of high income professionals moving into this area, often non-Chinese including high end hipster-owned businesses are starting to emerge in this portion. Many Fuzhou immigrants have moved out once they made more money were able to purchase apartments and houses outside of Manhattan. In a July 2018 report from Voices of NY, Fuzhou owned businesses have been declining on East Broadway due to high rents, and are being replaced by non-Asians. In addition, Fuzhou consumers that used to travel to the East Broadway neighborhood for commerce have now largely transitioned to traveling to Flushing's Chinatown in Queens, and Sunset Park's Chinatown in Brooklyn—the largest Fuzhou enclave in New York City—for commerce. Because East Broadway along with the eastern portion of Chinatown is becoming less busy and with the Fuzhou residents rapidly moving out of the neighborhood in large numbers resulting in declining numbers of Fuzhou customers, it is becoming unprofitable for new Chinese business owners, and it often attracts very few tourists. Since the COVID-19 pandemic in New York City in 2020, storefront vacancies have accelerated.

Mass evictions
However, in the eastern portion of Manhattan's Chinatown, whose apartment buildings carry the vast majority of the Fuzhou population, more than half of the Fuzhou-occupied apartments have been illegally subdivided into multiple rooms with many beds, running them as extremely overcrowded hotels, many of whose residents do not have leases. As a result, as new real estate developers and landlords are purchase more apartment buildings in the eastern Fuzhou section of Manhattan's Chinatown, the newer landlords legally evict tenants, allowing them to renovate apartment units and charge higher rent prices to higher-income households. This has mostly happened on the blocks and streets bordering the Seward Park area, Two Bridges, and the Lower East Side, which are more culturally mixed and much more gentrified, but it has recently spread deeper into the Fuzhou enclave.

There have also been many city officials cracking down on illegally subdivided units and kicking out occupants throughout Manhattan's Chinatown, but especially in the Fuzhou section, and Fuzhou tenant occupied apartments have been the main targets of these crackdowns.

Because many Fuzhou immigrants lack immigration paperwork, they often cannot find good-paying jobs and often working for cash, unlike the Cantonese immigrants that are more likely to have the legal residency paperwork and can find better-paying jobs. As a result, many Fuzhou tenants have had to resort to illegal apartment subdivision and rent their spaces to many other Fuzhou tenants to be able to pay the rent, especially since most of the Fuzhou tenants in Manhattan's Chinatown arrived during the 1990s when the rent was increasingly becoming expensive.

As with their Cantonese counterparts in Manhattan's Chinatown, especially including the older western Cantonese portion of Manhattan's Chinatown, they are more likely to have legal paperwork to be in the country and have been longer time residents with affordable rent-stabilized leases, which many arrived during the 1980s and earlier when the rents were more affordable. As a result, not as many needed to resort to illegally subdivide apartment spaces and rent their spaces to an excessive number of people to share the rent. Therefore, on a legal basis, they are often much harder to be forced out by the newer landlords despite the fact that the newer landlords continuously find ways to force them out as well.

All of these factors together are putting possible danger of Little Fuzhou shrinking very significantly in the near future.

Little Fuzhou, Brooklyn

Rise of New York's new Fuzhou cultural center in Brooklyn
The increasing Fuzhou influx to New York City has shifted to the Brooklyn Chinatown (布鲁克林華埠) located in Brooklyn's Sunset Park neighborhood, which was originally Cantonese dominated, in the 2000s because not only has Manhattan's Chinatown has become too expensive to afford housing, it has also become overcrowded, but also given their desire to continue to live in a Chinese community. This newer Chinatown within New York City's borough of Brooklyn was now the most affordable large Chinese enclave of NYC, which is why it became the most preferable Chinese enclave for the Fuzhou influx to settle in, especially with increasing influx of Fuzhou homeowners who have subdivided their homes into apartments like many other ethnic immigrants have done once they became successful homeowners.

This has opened opportunities as well provided as a new nexus for newly arriving Fuzhou immigrants to New York City to rent an apartment in Brooklyn's Chinatown by Fuzhou landlords with supposedly less housing discrimination in contrast to Cantonese landlords who are perceived to be more likely not to want Fuzhou tenants in their properties. However, there have been cases where Fuzhou landlords as well have discriminated against Fuzhou tenants by charging high rent prices.

Brooklyn's Chinatown has become the satellite Little Fuzhou of New York City, but it has quickly and largely surpassed as well as marginalizing the one within Manhattan's Chinatown as NYC's primary Fuzhou culture center. Property values have risen substantially due to the rapidly increasing Fuzhou population concentration in Brooklyn.

Reputation as Chinatown's Wall Street
East Broadway has been called the "Wall Street of Chinatown", due to the significant number of Chinese-owned financial institutions concentrated on this street and surrounding streets. The banks that are located on this Wall Street of Chinatown are Asia Bank, United Orient Bank, and CitiBank (corner of Mott Street) on Chatham Square. First American International Bank (formerly Hong Kong Bank) and Abacus Federal Savings Bank on the Bowery.

Onto East Broadway are Cathay Bank (formerly the Golden City Bank), East West Bank (formerly the Hang Seng Bank), a second Chinatown branch of First American International Bank and formerly named as Glory China Tower in the former spot of the Pagoda theater, the HSBC bank. A Cantonese newspaper company named Wah May Press was also located on 9 East Broadway.

Chinese gangs in the past

Cantonese gangs
East Broadway was once known to be one of the territories of Cantonese gangsters of Manhattan's Chinatown. The Golden Star Bar, which was once located on 9 East Broadway, was a place where Chinese gangs of a previous era often congregated.

A man named Herbert Liu, a former Hong Kong police officer had immigrated to Manhattan's Chinatown in the late 1960s. After arriving, later on Herbert Liu had encountered a gang member of Chinatown named Benny Ong, who was the boss of the Hip Sing Gang at the time and trying to recruit Liu to be a gang member. Herbert Liu had some meetings with Ong, which influenced him during the 1980s to begin making East Broadway and Division Street from Chatham Square to Market Street as his territories with a promise of riches from Hong Kong.

Liu recruited restaurateurs, merchants, and gambling house operators and enlisted former gang members that were forced out of the gangs of the old Chinatown on Mott Street and Pell Street. Chinatown then had gained another Tong (堂 Táng) or known as in English translation, gathering place. Liu named his gang organization as Freemasons, borrowing the name from the time period of the 19th century when there was an uprising against the Manchu. Liu had rented out a basement located on 52 East Broadway where it was a combination of headquarters and gaming hall.

The Ghost Shadows Gang, which had dominance over Mott Street had expressed concern about this new gang that had emerged and eventually leading to gang violence in the Golden Star Bar on East Broadway in 1982 resulting in three members of the Freemasons gang murdered. The Freemasons gang then fell apart and their attempted dominance over East Broadway never continued to grow.

There was one incident 1977 where Nei Wong, the leader of the Ghost Shadows was hanging with a Hong Kong cop's girlfriend close to underneath the Manhattan Bridge on East Broadway in the Chinese Quarter Nightclub and that Hong Kong cop that had arrived over witnessed them and then pulled out his police gun and brutally murdered them. With Nei Wong gone, Nicky Louie took over his spot in the Ghost Shadows gang.

In May 1985, there was a gang-related shooting outside of 30 East Broadway, which at the time was a Sichuan cuisine restaurant. The shooting eventually spilled over into the restaurant injuring a non-Asian 37 year old customer named Brian Monahan who was at the time an AT&T executive and had been dining with friends. A 4-year-old little boy named Lee Young Kwai was strolling down the street with his uncle was caught in the crossfire injuring his skull, but eventually recovered after the bullet was surgically removed from his skull at Bellevue Hospital; the uncle was not injured. A total of seven victims were injured in the crossfires of the shooting. Two males, who were 15 and 16 years old and were members of a Chinese street gang, were arrested and convicted. It was widely believed that Eastern Peace Gang and the Burmese Gang were the culprits as many local residents reported that they were fighting over for the surrounding territory.

Fuzhounese gangs
By the late 1980s to early 1990s, the most known recent gangs on East Broadway are now from Fuzhou, Fujian of China after this street had started to become a gathering center for Fuzhou immigrants starting in the late 1980s, though since the 2000s, that status has been dramatically and increasingly shifting to Brooklyn's Chinatown, which is now the largest Fuzhou enclave of NYC. The Fuzhou gangs that are known are the Fuk Ching, the Snakehead (gang), which are well known to smuggle illegal immigrants from Fuzhou to the United States and other countries and the Tung On Gang.

The Tung On gang was established between the 1980s–90s on East Broadway where they ran a gambling parlor. Parallel to the Cantonese Tong Gangs that had dominated the long-established Cantonese community in the western section of Chinatown, the Fuzhou gangs were the same for the Fuzhou community that was emerging in the 1990s, which made Manhattan's Chinatown expand past its original traditional borderlines further east onto the Lower East Side. A man named Alan Man Sin Lau, the leader of the Fukien American Association, gained a status like Benny Ong did with the Cantonese.

The Fuk Ching gang members are often the workers of the Snakehead gang where they would be the ones to collect money from the illegal Fuzhou immigrants who owed money to the Snakeheads, which they had borrowed to come over to the United States. Sometimes, the Fuk Ching gang members would hold the migrants hostage and even violently beat them until they paid up the loans they owed.

Although the Fuzhou Gangs gained more prevalence much later than the Cantonese gangs in Chinatown, they have been around as early as the 1980s though with more limited prevalence prior to the time when the Cantonese Freemasons gang were attempting to claim East Broadway as its own territories, which fell apart after three Freemason gang members were killed in gang violence.

See also

 Chinese Americans in New York City
 Fuzhounese Americans
 Chinatown, New York City (disambiguation)
 Chinatowns in the United States

References

External links
Sun Sing Theater in black-and-white photo – a black-and-white photo of the Sun Sing Theater under the Manhattan Bridge on East Broadway.
Sun Sing Theater in color - a color photo of the Sun Sing Theater under the Manhattan Bridge on East Broadway.
The Beautiful Butterflies performance - a photo of the performance "The Beautiful Butterflies" at The New Canton Theater (later renamed to Sun Sing Theater) from 1950.
Pagoda Theater – a photo of the Pagoda Theater on East Broadway and Catherine Street.
Newspaper on Pagoda Theater – a photo of a newspaper article published by Sam Zolotow on May 29, 1964 on the opening of the Pagoda Theater.

Chinatowns in New York City
Chinese-American culture in New York City
Chinatown, Manhattan
Lower East Side
Neighborhoods in Brooklyn